Khatumo State, officially the Khatumo State of Somalia, was a state government succeeding the SSC Movement. Centred on the Sool, Sanaag regions and the Buuhoodle district of Togdheer region, its leaders declared the territory an autonomous state in 2012.

In 2011, the state's militias succeeded in removing Somaliland troops from its borders. On 20 October 2017 in Aynaba, an agreement was signed between the Khatumo President Ali Khalif Galaydh and the Somaliland government which stipulated the amendment of Somaliland's constitution and territorial integration into Somaliland. However, the Vice President of Khatumo expressed his disagreement with the agreement and remained actively opposed to Somaliland.

The state collapsed in 2018 when the city of Las Anod was assimilated by Somaliland using military force, with the checkpoints in Tukaraq and Las Anod being controlled by Somaliland troops. In 2023 at Las Anod, mass demonstrations and civil unrest erupted into armed conflict. The region is currently still contested between Somaliland and local militias of the Dhulbahante clan, who declared the region as SSC-Khatumo State and have raised the Khaatumo flag in the city square.

History

Establishment

Khatumo is derived from an Arabic term meaning a "positive conclusion." The administration's stated aim was to bring development and stability to the region through the establishment of a locally based government. Many inhabitants previously self-referred as being denizens of SSC, which became KS (Khatumo State).

Control of the territory was disputed between Khatumo State (formerly HBM-SSC or Hoggaanka Badbaadada iyo Mideynta SSC), the autonomous Somalian region of Puntland, and the Republic of Somaliland.

In January 2012, the Khatumo State administration was finalized after a series of domestic and overseas conferences beginning in 2007 between prominent political figures, traditional leaders and local residents. The territory's capital was initially at Taleh.

In March 2012, Transitional Federal Government of Somalia (TFG) announced that it had approved the Khatumo State.

Split of Khaatumo and dissolution of Ali Khalif group 
Within a year of its founding, Khaatumo began to dissolve due to a lack of palpable results and by 2015 the proto-state practically ceased to function, with the idea of an autonomous Khaatumo state having lost ground among the Dhulbahante, the clan that inhabits the area, a year after its establishment.

In August 2016 Khatumo state commenced peace talks with Somaliland. The talks, however, caused a major disagreement between the president and vice-president of the administration, Ali Khalif Galaydh and Abdulle Agalule respectively, which eventually produced two separate administrations that both claimed to be the legitimate government. The group led by Ali Khalif reached an agreement with Somaliland, at the town of Aynabo in October 2017, which stipulated that under the condition of changing the constitution of Somaliland, the organisation would become integrated within the Somaliland government.

The vice president of Khatumo State, Cabdalle Maxamuud Cali (Cagalule), rejected the agreement, and declared himself the president of Khatumo State and announced that he supported Puntland's efforts to reclaim the Sool region.

2023 conflict 

On February 6, 2023, the Dhulbahante clan elders declared their intent to form a state government named "SSC-Khatumo" within the Federal Government of Somalia. On 19 March, the traditional leaders met with a delegation of MPs from Federal Government of Somalia.

Government
The Khatumo State governmental authority was structured somewhat differently from Somalia's other autonomous regional administrations. At its establishment, it had three presidents, four councils and various ministerial positions. In August 2014, Member of the Federal Parliament of Somalia and former Prime Minister of Somalia Ali Khalif Galaydh was elected President of Khatumo State. He defeated former co-president Mohamed Yusuf Jama (Indhosheel) by 21 votes to 9. Assembly members, who had been appointed by traditional leaders, also selected Abdul Sulub as vice president. The parliament was composed of 33 members.

Military
Khatumo maintains its own security forces. Exclusively financed by the state administration, they are tasked with assuring local security and defending the region's borders. According to Khatumo President Abdinuur Elmi Qaaji, the forces are well trained and armed. Khatumo troops have been deployed in defense operations against invading Somaliland troops in Buhoodle and other disputed towns within SSC territory. In 2012, Khatumo forces were led by Abdirisak Fanah, with Omar Jama Saleiman serving as official spokesman.

See also

2010 Ayn clashes

References

External links
What is Khatumo State?

States and territories established in 2012
Territorial disputes of Somalia
States of Somalia
2012 establishments in Somaliland